Gillmeria macrornis is a moth species of the family Pterophoridae. It is known from Russia and China.

References

Moths described in 1930
Platyptiliini
Moths of Asia